The Dinosaur Deposits of Niger can be found in the Agadez Region, Tchirozérine Department, of Niger.

Site description
The isolated area of dinosaur deposits in Agadez Region consists of well-preserved skeletons over a wide area.

Vertebrates found
 
  Sarcosuchus imperator
  Ouranosaurus nigeriensis
  Afrovenator abakensis
  Suchomimus tenerensis
  Jobaria tiguidensis
  Spinostropheus gautieri

World Heritage Status
This site was added to the UNESCO World Heritage Tentative List on May 26, 2006, in the Mixed (Cultural + Natural) category.

Notes

References
Gisements des dinosauriens - UNESCO World Heritage Centre Retrieved 2009-03-03.

Dinosaurs of Africa
Prehistoric Niger
World Heritage Tentative List for Niger
Agadez Region